Sir Zelman Cowen,  (7 October 1919 – 8 December 2011) was an Australian legal scholar and university administrator who served as the 19th Governor-General of Australia, in office from 1977 to 1982.

Cowen was born in Melbourne, and attended Scotch College before going on to the University of Melbourne. His studies were interrupted by World War II, during which he served in the Royal Australian Navy. After the war's end, Cowen attended New College, Oxford, on a Rhodes Scholarship. He subsequently won the prestigious Vinerian Scholarship as the best student in the Bachelor of Civil Law degree. He remained at Oxford after graduating, serving as a fellow of Oriel College from 1947 to 1950.

In 1951, Cowen returned to Australia to become dean of the law faculty at the University of Melbourne. In 1953, still while at the University of Melbourne, he was awarded a Fulbright Senior Scholarship in Law to Harvard University. He became known as an expert on constitutional law, and was a visiting professor at a number of overseas institutions. He later served as vice-chancellor of the University of New England (1966–1970) and the University of Queensland (1970–1977). In 1977, Malcolm Fraser appointed Cowen to succeed John Kerr as governor-general. He was an uncontroversial choice, and became the second Jewish holder of the position, after Sir Isaac Isaacs. After leaving office, Cowen returned to academia, serving as provost of Oriel College, Oxford, from 1982 to 1990.

Early life
Cowen was born in Melbourne in 1919 into a Jewish family named Cohen, the son of Bernard Cohen (1892 – 1975), from Belarus and Sara Cohen (née Granat; 1893–1989), born in Australia. His paternal grandparents were Jewish immigrants from Belarus in the Russian Empire. The name was formally changed to Cowen when he was a young boy. He was educated at St Kilda Park State School, Scotch College and the University of Melbourne. He served in the Royal Australian Navy during the Second World War, and was in Darwin during the bombing raid of 1942, before being transferred to Brisbane to work in the cipher unit of General MacArthur's office. He married Anna Wittner in 1945. Cowen then went as a Rhodes Scholar to New College, Oxford, where he completed a Bachelor of Civil Law degree and jointly won the Vinerian Scholarship. From 1947 to 1950 he was a fellow of Oriel College, Oxford, and was also a consultant on legal matters to the British Military Government in Allied-occupied Germany.

Educational career
In 1951 Cowen returned to Australia and became Dean of the Law Faculty at the University of Melbourne, a post he held until 1966 where he appointed, and worked with Francis Patrick Donovan. During these years he was frequently a visiting professor at American universities, including the University of Chicago, the University of Illinois and the University of Washington. He also advised the British Colonial Office on constitutional matters and advised the governments of Ghana and Hong Kong on legal issues. Among many other works, he published a biography of Sir Isaac Isaacs, the first Australian-born and first Jewish Governor-General of Australia.

Cowen was appointed Vice-Chancellor of the University of New England in Armidale, New South Wales, in 1966. The following year, he produced for ABC television the "Yes" case for the Australian referendum, 1967 (Aboriginals). From 1970 to 1977 he was Vice-Chancellor of the University of Queensland in Brisbane, during the difficult years of the Vietnam War and Springbok tour student protests. In 1977 Ray Crooke painted Portrait of Professor Emeritus Sir Zelman Cowen which is part of the University of Queensland collection. By this time he was regarded as one of the leading constitutional lawyers in the English-speaking world. He was Emeritus Professor of Law at Melbourne and the Tagore Professor of Law at the University of Calcutta. During his time in Queensland he handled disturbances at the university, resulting from protests against the Vietnam War, with diplomatic skill.

Governor-General

When Sir John Kerr's turbulent period of office as Governor-General ended with his early resignation in 1977, the Prime Minister, Malcolm Fraser, offered Cowen the post. He was in some ways a perfect choice. He was a distinguished Australian with an international reputation, his knowledge of the Constitution and the law were beyond dispute, and his political views were unknown. The fact that Cowen was Jewish gave his appointment a multicultural aspect in keeping with contemporary Australian sentiment. He served four and a half years as Governor-General, from December 1977 to July 1982.

Post vice-regal career
From 1982 to 1990 Cowen was Provost of Oriel College, Oxford.  After his retirement he returned to Australia and became active in Jewish community affairs in Melbourne. He also pursued a range of other interests, including serving for five years on the board of Fairfax Newspapers (three of them as Chairman) during a turbulent period for the company; and being patron of St Kilda Football Club. During the lead-up to the 1999 Australian republic referendum, he supported a moderate republican position.

Personal life
On 7 June 1945, Cowen married Anna Wittner (5 July 1925 - 10 June 2022) and had four children, Shimon, Yosef, Kate and Ben.  His son, Rabbi Shimon Cowen, is Director of the Institute for Judaism and Civilization in Melbourne.

Death
Cowen suffered from Parkinson's disease for at least the last 15 years of his life. He died on 8 December 2011, at the  age of 92, at his home in Toorak, Victoria. It was the 34th anniversary of his swearing-in as Governor-General in 1977.

His state funeral at Melbourne's Temple Beth Israel in St Kilda was attended by the Governor-General, Dame Quentin Bryce, the Prime Minister, Julia Gillard, the Opposition Leader, Tony Abbott, and former Prime Ministers Malcolm Fraser, Bob Hawke and John Howard.

Honours
Cowen's first honour was a Knight Bachelor in 1976. When appointed Governor-General he was made a Knight Grand Cross of the Order of St Michael and St George (GCMG) and Knight of the Order of Australia (AK) in 1977, and sworn into the Privy Council in 1977. When Queen Elizabeth II visited Australia in 1980 she appointed Cowen a Knight Grand Cross of the Royal Victorian Order (GCVO).

He was an Honorary Fellow of the Australian Academy of Technological Sciences and Engineering (FTSE).

Awards

In 1981, the Royal Australian Institute of Architects (RAIA) established the Sir Zelman Cowen Award for Public Architecture which is widely recognised as Australia's leading award for public buildings.

Melbourne Law School awards the Zelman Cowen Scholarship to incoming Juris Doctor students. Awarded purely on the basis of academic merit, it is the law school's most prestigious scholarship. A special issue of the "Melbourne University Law Review" in 2015 published papers from a 2014 conference on legal, international, liberty, literary, university, and other public issues of significance in Cowen's life and work; contributors included Glyn Davis, Justice Susan Kenny, Michael Crommelin, Donald Markwell, Cheryl Saunders, and Sir Frank Berman.

Zelman Cowen was a 1953 Fulbright Senior Scholar in Law from the University of Melbourne to Harvard University. In 1985, he was made an honorary fellow of Trinity College Dublin.

Bibliography

Further reading
 "Three Governors-General: Hasluck, Kerr, Cowen" in 
 Donald Markwell, "Sir Zelman Cowen", in 'A large and liberal education': higher education for the 21st century, Australian Scholarly Publishing & Trinity College, University of Melbourne, 2007.
 Donald Markwell, "Sir Zelman Cowen: 'a touch of healing'" and "Universities and contemporary society: civility in a free society", in "Instincts to lead": on leadership, peace, and education, Connor Court, 2013.

References

Sources
 Speech about Cowen's life
 Profile of Zelman Cowen

 
 
 

1919 births
2011 deaths
Alumni of New College, Oxford
Australian Jews
Australian Knights Bachelor
Australian Knights Grand Cross of the Order of St Michael and St George
Australian Knights Grand Cross of the Royal Victorian Order
Australian King's Counsel
Australian Rhodes Scholars
Australian expatriates in England
Australian members of the Privy Council of the United Kingdom
Australian people of Belarusian-Jewish descent
Fellows of Oriel College, Oxford
Fellows of the Australian Academy of Technological Sciences and Engineering
Governors-General of Australia
Honorary Fellows of Trinity College Dublin
Knights of the Order of Australia
Knights of the Order of St John
Lawyers from Melbourne
Melbourne Law School alumni
People educated at Scotch College, Melbourne
People with Parkinson's disease
Provosts of Oriel College, Oxford
Quadrant (magazine) people
Recipients of the Order of Merit of the Italian Republic
Royal Australian Navy personnel of World War II
Academic staff of the University of Calcutta
Academic staff of the University of New England (Australia)
Academic staff of the University of Queensland